Likalaneng is a community council located in the Maseru District of Lesotho. Its population in 2006 was 10,757.

Villages
The community of Likalaneng includes the villages of:

Aupolasi
Boitšireletso
Feeder Camp
Freistata
Ha Joele
Ha Khama
Ha Khojane
Ha Khosi
Ha Lebiletsa
Ha Lebusa
Ha Lempe
Ha Letapata
Ha Letele
Ha Likomisi
Ha Makhobalo
Ha Maliehe
Ha Matlapu
Ha Matšabisa
Ha Matsoai
Ha Moalosi

Ha Mochochoko
Ha Mofubetsoana
Ha Mokebisa
Ha Mokhanya
Ha Mokhathi
Ha Montši
Ha Moqobokoane
Ha Mosito
Ha Motloang
Ha Motoko (Phuleng)
Ha Mphakho
Ha Nyakane
Ha Pae-pae
Ha Phomolo
Ha Raloti
Ha Rantelali
Ha Rapolokoane
Ha Rasepukunyane
Ha Sankong
Ha Sefele

Ha Seiboko
Ha Setala
Ha Soosa
Ha Teri
Ha Thaba-Bosiu
Ha Tholoana
Ha Tlali
Ha Tšitso
Ha Tsolo
Khoshane
Khubetsoana
Kolobere
Lehlakeng
Leropong
Letlapeng
Mafotholeng
Mahooaneng
Makoaeleng
Malerung
Mangope-matšo

Matsiring
Moeaneng
Mohale Camp
Mokh'ukh'ung
Mokhoabong
Monontša
Panteng
Patising (Ha Malebanye)
Sea-point
Sehlabaneng
Sekokoaneng
Sethamana
Tetebela
Thaba-Putsoa
Thoteng
Tiping
Tsehlong
Tšieng

References

External links
 Google map of community villages

Populated places in Maseru District